Go to Heaven is the eleventh studio album (sixteenth overall) by rock band the Grateful Dead, released April 28, 1980, on Arista Records. It is the band's first album with keyboardist Brent Mydland. Go to Heaven was both the third Grateful Dead studio album in a row to use an outside producer, this time Gary Lyons, and the last for over seven years.

Recording
Keyboardist Keith Godchaux and vocalist Donna Godchaux left the Grateful Dead in February 1979, replaced in both positions by Brent Mydland. While in Silver, Mydland had performed on the hit pop song "Wham Bam Shang-a-Lang", also playing and writing tracks for that band's 1976 country rock album. Following that, he toured with rhythm guitarist Bob Weir's solo band, leading to a keyboard position in the Grateful Dead.

The Grateful Dead were contractually obligated to record another studio album before they could release live material. As with the previous two albums, they used an outside producer, per an agreement with Clive Davis, and in the hope of a more mainstream production with greater commercial potential (and perhaps a hit single). Davis sent British producer Gary Lyons, who was known for his success with Foreigner's debut album. With track construction stretching past a couple months, Lyons simultaneously began working with Aerosmith, taking over the production of Night in the Ruts. He commuted between California and New York, trading off with assistant producer Peter Thea.

The album was recorded at the band's own studio; however, as happened while finishing Terrapin Station, overdubs were made in New York City (at Media Sound) while the Dead toured the region. Instead of compiling different takes of a solo, as with other productions, Lyons learned to keep the sequences whole. According to recording engineer Betty Cantor-Jackson, "Jerry's sitting there and Gary says, 'Well, what do you think?' And Jerry says, 'I wouldn't play it that way.' It was true, because his style had a certain logic to it and there were certain ways he put together notes, the sequence of notes, which had to do with the way he thought about music. So to cut that up it no longer sounded the way Jerry thought."

Weir had a greater influence than on previous studio albums, writing three of the songs, with his lyricist John Barlow. Both "Lost Sailor" and "Saint of Circumstance" mention sails and navigation, and reference the Dog Star. They were usually played live as a pair. Lead guitarist Jerry Garcia brought just two songs for the album. Both were composed with his writing partner Robert Hunter: the lyrically obtuse, Berry-esque rocker, "Alabama Getaway" and the meticulously arranged "Althea". Hunter said the title character of the latter was inspired by Minerva. A third Garcia-Hunter effort, "What'll You Raise," was not recorded to the guitarist's satisfaction during the sessions after failing to enter their live rotation; it was ultimately released as a bonus track on the album's 2004/2006 reissue. Mydland's "Far From Me" and "Easy to Love You" were written for Weir's band but Garcia encouraged him to present them to the Dead. The second had lyric additions by Barlow (at the behest of Davis). Unlike the songs Weir and Garcia brought, Mydland wrote straightforward pop songs, usually with a lyrical focus on unrequited love. He also brought synthesizers to the Dead, playing a Minimoog solo on "Alabama Getaway" and a Prophet-5 on Weir's funk-incorporating "Feel Like a Stranger".

Folk standard "Don't Ease Me In" had been played in the band's former incarnation as Mother McCree's Uptown Jug Champions, and was the A-side of the first Grateful Dead single. It had re-entered their live set lists shortly before the addition of Mydland. As with the previous two albums, drummers Bill Kreutzmann and Mickey Hart contributed an instrumental, "Antwerp's Placebo (the plumber)". The subtitle was Hart's taunt at Lyons, who had worked as a plumber. To tighten the beat, Lyons had focused on one drummer, keeping mostly Kreutzmann's work in the mix. Weir also disagreed with the stylized, abrupt ending to "Feel Like a Stranger", but he worked with Lyons again the following year for his Bobby and the Midnites project.

Garcia had band sound man Dan Healy set up a low wattage radio transmitter so he could drive around the neighborhood and listen to how the production would sound on a car radio. Go to Heaven would be the last Grateful Dead studio album for seven years, though there was an aborted attempt four years later.

Release
Though Go to Heaven fared better on the charts than the previous two albums, ultimately sales were disappointing, due in part to the cover art. In an era when album artwork affected sales, the band, according to band chronicler Blair Jackson, looked like "hippie versions of John Travolta in Saturday Night Fever." The front cover of a Grateful Dead album had never had a straightforward band photo (they had appeared obliquely on the cover of Workingman's Dead, in costume and within the context of the album's theme, and on their first album as part of a collage). The turn away from highly recognizable psychedelic and illustrated artwork implied the same for the music within. Worse, to rock fans and Deadheads, was the connotation with disco, represented by the tailored white suits the band wore in the photo.

However, this was not the intention. Weir had titled the album and his original idea for the back cover was to have the white suits in rags, with the scraggly band lying among empty wine bottles, to convey the joke "Go to Heaven/Go to Hell". With the back cover illustrated instead with a somewhat nondescript phoenix, the humorous dichotomy and winking irony were lost and some buyers mistakenly assumed the Dead were committing to discoeven though much of the album returned to the rock and blues of the band's previous releases. The band had flirted with the style on singles from the last two albums. In the meantime there had been a large disco backlash. The genre was already considered in decline and radio formats had separated disco from rock music.

Two singles were released from Go to Heaven: "Alabama Getaway" and "Don't Ease Me In". Both were backed with "Far From Me". The first was a minor hit, finding airplay in some markets. To promote the upcoming album and single, the Grateful Dead again appeared on Saturday Night Live, playing "Alabama Getaway" and "Saint of Circumstance". The show's writers, Al Franken and Tom Davis, were Deadheads and Kreutzmann was friends with the show's John Belushi, who appeared onstage with the Dead earlier in the week.

Except for the interstitial instrumental, all of the new songs were played live, premiering between the start of recording and the album's release. Mydland's songs remained during his tenure, with "Easy to Love You" absent 1981–1989. The "Lost Sailor>Saint of Circumstance" pairing lasted until 1986, after which the first song was dropped.

Go to Heaven was released on CD in 1987. In 2004 it was expanded and remastered for the Beyond Description box set on Rhino Records. This version was released individually, April 11, 2006. One of the bonus tracks, studio outtake "Peggy-O", appeared as a bonus on Terrapin Station, in a less complete version. Ultimately, a version of the song was not released until Dick's Picks Volume 15, in 1999.

Reception
When it was released, Go to Heaven generally received average to negative responses from critics. Though it was something of a return to the band's roots and had "more-punchy rock sounds", it was still a mainstream attempt and was seen as "mushy" in many reviews. Mydland's vocals resembled Michael McDonald to some critics who compared his California soft rock influence to the direction taken by the Doobie Brothers. However reviewers of Billboard expressed an opinion that this disc should "attract new fans as well as solidify the band's already huge following".

However, the criticism has softened and Go to Heaven is now regarded as an important album in the band's catalog. As noted by a retrospective review in AllMusic, "Time has somewhat mellowed the general disdain that critics and Deadheads alike leveled at Go to Heaven". The review also notes that a number of the songs developed into strong live numbers and praises the addition of Mydland to the band's lineup. J. M. DeMatteis's review in Rolling Stone summarized the album as "more of the same uninspired fluff that's become the Grateful Dead's recorded stock in trade", though he also acclaimed Brent Mydland's contributions. DeMatteis, who is better known for his comic book work, came to regret his review of the album, ending his career as a music critic as a consequence. In contrast, Robert Christgau, while complimentary of the rendition of "Don't Ease Me In", considered Mydland an "utter wimp".  In 2015, Classic Rock Review wrote, "While this may be a far cry from the group’s lauded stage improvisation, it made for an enjoyable studio album which holds up decades later.... It still sounds good today and shows that this band had some vast talent away from the stage."

"Althea" became a concert staple and was ranked as the fifth best Grateful Dead song of all time by Stereogum, which said that the studio version "captures the band at its swampiest."  Stereogum also considered Go to Heaven to be underrated.

Bassist Phil Lesh said "The cover, featuring us in Saturday Night Fever disco suits against a white background, reinforced the impression that we were 'going commercial'. Regardless of the reaction from hardcore Deadheads, Go to Heaven sold fairly well after its release in April 1980, making number twenty-three on the charts and recouping its studio costs. The critics ravaged it, however; the least offensive description I saw was 'cotton candy'. Personally, I thought that the music was a lot better than the album coverthe Garcia-Hunter and Weir-Barlow songs were major additions to our repertoire, and Brent’s two songs, in spite of having been written before joining the band, gave notice that a new voice had arrived." Lesh also stated his preference for releasing live albums, explaining  our last studio album for seven years, as our disenchantment with studios, producers, and record company executives was complete; and besides, we had fulfilled the current Arista contract requirements with three studio albums in three years."

Kreutzmann likewise stated "If you go back and (re)listen to it, you’ll find that time has been very kind to Go to Heaven. It plays better now than it did back then. That’s still no excuse for the cover, thoughall six of us, dressed all in white disco suits against a white background."

Track listing

Notes:

Additional recordings from October 23, 1980 appear on Reckoning.
Additional recordings from October 25, 1980 appear on Reckoning and Dead Set.

Personnel

Grateful Dead
 Jerry Garcia – guitar, vocals
 Mickey Hart – drums
 Bill Kreutzmann – drums
 Phil Lesh – bass guitar
 Brent Mydland – keyboards, vocals
 Bob Weir – guitar, vocals

Technical
Betty Cantor-Jackson – engineering
John Cutler - additional engineering
Bob Matthews - additional engineering
Peter Thea - additional engineering

Reissue personnel

James Austin – production
Hugh Brown – art coordination
Andrew Clarke – liner notes
Reggie Collins – annotations
Jimmy Edwards – associate production
Sheryl Farber – editorial supervision
Tom Flye – additional mixing
John Frankenheimer - business affairs
Joe Gastwirt – mastering, production consultancy
Robert Gatley – mixing assistance
Herb Greene - photography
Robin Hurley – associate production
Eileen Law – research
David Lemieux – production
Hale Milgrim – associate production
Scott Pascucci – associate production
Cameron Sears – executive production
Bob Seidemann - photography
Steve Vance – design

Charts

Weekly charts

Singles

References

1980 albums
Arista Records albums
Grateful Dead albums
Rhino Records albums